Armin Smajić (born 10 June 1964) is a Bosnian football manager and former player.

Playing career

Club
Born in Sarajevo, SR Bosnia and Herzegovina, back then within Yugoslavia, he played with FK Željezničar Sarajevo in the 1985–86 Yugoslav First League. Then he played with OFK Kikinda in the Yugoslav Second League. Between 1989 and 1992 he played in France with Clermont Foot. Then he returned to Serbian side OFK Kikinda and played with them in the 1992–93 First League of FR Yugoslavia. Then in 1993 he moved with Germany where he will play the rest of his career, chronologically, VfR Bürstadt, SG 01 Hoechst, Wormatia Worms, Eintracht Bad Kreuznach, SV Südwest Ludwigshafen and FC Schönmattenwag.

Managerial career
In 2006, he became player-manager of FC Schönmattenwag, and afterwards he dedicated himself exclusively to coaching, having managed a number of German clubs since then, namely, SG Bobenheim-Roxheim, Eintracht Lambsheim, ATSV Wattenheim, 1.FC Niedernhausen, TBVfL Neustadt-Wildenheid and FSG Bensheim.

References

1964 births
Living people
Footballers from Sarajevo
Association football midfielders
Yugoslav footballers
Bosnia and Herzegovina footballers
FK Željezničar Sarajevo players
OFK Kikinda players
Clermont Foot players
VfR Bürstadt players
SG 01 Hoechst players
Wormatia Worms players
Eintracht Bad Kreuznach players
Yugoslav First League players
Yugoslav Second League players
First League of Serbia and Montenegro players
Yugoslav expatriate footballers
Expatriate footballers in France
Yugoslav expatriate sportspeople in France
Bosnia and Herzegovina expatriate footballers
Expatriate footballers in Serbia and Montenegro
Bosnia and Herzegovina expatriate sportspeople in Serbia and Montenegro
Expatriate footballers in Germany
Bosnia and Herzegovina expatriate sportspeople in Germany
Bosnia and Herzegovina football managers
Bosnia and Herzegovina expatriate football managers
Expatriate football managers in Germany